Brachodes paghmanus is a moth of the family Brachodidae. It is found in Afghanistan.

The forewings are grey with whitish-yellow scales. The hindwings are grey.

References

Moths described in 1998
Brachodidae